Mr. Bumble is a fictional character and minor antagonist in the 1838 novel Oliver Twist by Charles Dickens.

Character

The allusion to Mudfog was removed when the novel was published as a book. In Chapter 1 Bumble is described as "A fat man, and a choleric ... Mr. Bumble had a great idea of his oratorical powers and his importance. He had displayed the one and vindicated the other. He relaxed."

While Mr. Bumble preaches Christian principle he himself fails to live up to these lofty ideals by behaving without compassion or mercy toward the paupers under his charge. For  example, in Chapter 3 Bumble calls Oliver a "naughty orphan which nobody can't love". In his novels Dickens chose his character's names carefully and 'Bumble' lives up to the symbolism of his name through his displays of self-importance, greed, hypocrisy and foolishness. Yet Dickens briefly reveals Bumble's human side when he escorts Oliver to the premises of Mr Sowerberry, the undertaker. When Oliver bursts into tears and expresses his fears, Bumble "regarded Oliver's piteous and helpless look, with some astonishment, for a few seconds; hemmed three or four times in a husky manner, and, after muttering something about 'that troublesome cough', bade Oliver dry his eyes and be a good boy. Then, once more taking his hand, he walked on with him in silence." However, Bumble does not act on this finer feeling.

Marriage

Having checked her possessions and having cast an appraising eye over her furniture in her absence, Mr. Bumble woos the widow Mrs. Corney, the matron of the workhouse, by flirting with her while drinking his tea. 

In Chapter 27 he declares his feelings:
"The board allow you coals, don’t they, Mrs. Corney?" inquired the beadle, affectionately pressing her hand.

"And candles", replied Mrs. Corney, slightly returning the pressure. 

"Coals, candles and house-rent free", said Mr. Bumble. "Oh, Mrs. Corney, what an angel you are!"

The lady was not proof against this burst of feeling. She sank into Mr. Bumble's arms; and that gentleman, in his agitation, imprinted a passionate kiss upon her chaste nose.

"Such porochial perfection!” exclaimed Mr. Bumble, rapturously. “You know that Mr Slout is worse to-night, my fascinator?"

"Yes?" replied Mrs. Corney, bashfully.

"He can't live a week, the doctor says", pursued Mr. Bumble. "He is the master of this establishment; his death will cause a wacancy; a wacancy that must be filled up. Oh, Mrs. Corney, what a project this opens! What a opportunity for a joining of hearts and housekeeping's!"

Mrs. Corney sobbed.

His amorous feelings being reciprocated, the two soon marry but Bumble's new wife turns out to be a sharp-tongued and tyrannical woman who nags and browbeats him. By Chapter 37 Bumble has been married for two months and is no longer beadle but is now Master of the workhouse; however, he is not happy with his more advanced situation. He states: 
"I sold myself ... for six teaspoons, a pair of sugar-tongs, and a milk pot; with a small quantity of second-hand furniture, and twenty pound in money. I went very reasonable. Cheap, dirt cheap!"

"Cheap!" cried a shrill voice in Mr. Bumble's ear: "you would have been dear at any price; and dear enough I paid for you, Lord above knows that!"

When she further berates him by demanding "Are you going to sit there snoring all day?" he responds "I am going to sit here, as long as I think proper, ma'am. . . . And although I was not snoring, I shall snore, gape, sneeze, laugh, or cry, as the humour strikes me; and being my prerogative."

Humiliation before paupers

Bumble receives a more public humiliation at the hands of his wife when he attempts to enter the workhouse as the new master, only to be driven out by her before the paupers:
"Hem!" said Mr. Bumble, summoning up all his native dignity. "These women at least shall continue to respect the prerogative. Hallo! hallo there! What do you mean by this noise, you hussies?"

With these words, Mr. Bumble opened the door, and walked in with a very fierce and angry manner: which was at once exchanged for a most humiliated and cowering air, as his eyes unexpectedly rested on the form of his lady wife.

"My dear," said Mr. Bumble, "I didn’t know you were here."

"Didn't know I was here!" repeated Mrs. Bumble. "What do you do here?"

"I thought they were talking rather too much to be doing their work properly, my dear," replied Mr. Bumble: glancing distractedly at a couple of old women at the wash-tub, who were comparing notes of admiration at the workhouse-master's humility.

"You thought – they were talking too much?" said Mrs. Bumble. "What business is it of yours?"

"Why, my dear –" urged Mr. Bumble submissively.

"What business is it of yours?" demanded Mrs. Bumble, again.

"It's very true, you're matron here, my dear", submitted Mr. Bumble; "but I thought you mightn't be in the way just then."

"I'll tell you what, Mr. Bumble," returned his lady. "We don't want any of your interference. You're a great deal too fond of poking your nose into things that don't concern you, making everybody in the house laugh, the moment your back is turned, and making yourself look like a fool every hour in the day."

"Be off; come!"

Mr. Bumble, seeing with excruciating feelings, the delight of the two old paupers, who were tittering together most rapturously, hesitated for an instant. Mrs. Bumble, whose patience brooked no delay, caught up a bowl of soap-suds, and motioning him towards the door, ordered him instantly to depart, on pain of receiving the contents upon his portly person.

What could Mr. Bumble do? He looked dejectedly round, and slunk away; and, as he reached the door, the titterings of the paupers broke into a shrill chuckle of irrepressible delight. It wanted but this. He was degraded in their eyes; he had lost caste and station before the very paupers; he had fallen from all the height and pomp of beadleship, to the lowest depth of the most snubbed hen-peckery.

When later in the novel Bumble is astonished to discover from Mr Brownlow that in the law a husband is responsible for the actions of his wife he famously declares that: “If the law supposes that – the law is a ass – a idiot. If that's the eye of the law, the law's a bachelor; and the worse I may wish the law is, that his eye may be opened by experience —  by experience."

Downfall
The former Mrs. Corney had been in attendance at the death of the nurse Sally Thingummy and purloined the locket and ring Sally Thingummy had taken from Oliver's mother as she tended her on her deathbed. Monks buys these items from the Bumbles and throws them into the River Thames, hoping that, by destroying them, Oliver's true identity will remain hidden. When they are exposed as being complicit in Monks' plot Bumble and his wife are deprived of their offices and themselves are reduced to becoming paupers in the workhouse where once they had caused so much misery and suffering to others.

The expression "Bumbledom" is named after the character and is used to describe the "meddlesome self-importance of the petty bureaucrat".

Media portrayals
Actors who have played Mr. Bumble include:

Film
Oliver Twist (1912) – Stuart Holmes
Oliver Twist (1916) – Harry Rattenbury
Oliver Twist (1919) – József Hajdú
Oliver Twist (1922) – James A. Marcus
Oliver Twist (1933) – Lionel Belmore
Oliver Twist (1948) – Francis L. Sullivan
Oliver! (1968) – Harry Secombe
Oliver Twist (1974) – Larry D. Mann (voice actor for animated film)
Las Aventuras de Oliver Twist (1987) – Juan Domingo
Oliver Twist (2005) – Jeremy Swift

Television
Oliver and the Artful Dodger (1972 TV film) - Ronald Long
Oliver Twist (1982) – Timothy West
Oliver Twist (1985) – Godfrey James
Saban's Adventures of Oliver Twist (1996) – Will Ryan
Oliver Twist (1999) – David Ross
Oliver Twist (2007) – Gregor Fisher
Dickensian (2015) – Richard Ridings

Theatre
Oliver Twist (1868) – Lionel Brough at the Queen's Theatre, Long Acre
Oliver!  (1960) – Paul Whitsun-Jones / Robert Bridges / Rob Inglis (original London production)
Oliver! (1964) – Alan Crofoot (original Broadway production)
Oliver! (1983) – Peter Bayliss (London revival)
Oliver! (1994) – James Saxon  (London revival)
Oliver! (2009)  – Julius D'Silva (London revival)

References

External links
Depictions of Bumble, the Parish Beadle from Oliver Twist and other Beadles – Victorian Web

Oliver Twist characters
Male characters in film
Male film villains
Musical theatre characters
Literary archetypes by name
Literary characters introduced in 1838
Fictional child abusers
Fictional people from the 19th-century
Male characters in literature
Male characters in television
Male literary villains
Fictional English people